The Alexander Gomelsky EuroLeague Coach of the Year is an annual award of Europe's premier level basketball league, the EuroLeague, that is given to each season's best head coach. The award was first introduced in the 2004–05 season. The winner of the award receives the Alexander Gomelsky Trophy, named after the Russian head basketball coach, who among other achievements, led Rīgas ASK to three consecutive EuroLeague titles, between 1958 and 1960, before adding one more with CSKA Moscow in 1971. 

Pini Gershon was the first recipient of the award, after winning the 2005 EuroLeague title with Maccabi Tel Aviv. Željko Obradović has won the award three times.

Winners

Notes:
 There was no awarding in the 2019–20, because the season was cancelled due to the coronavirus pandemic in Europe.

Multiple honours

Head coaches

Head Coach nationality

Teams

See also 
 List of EuroLeague-winning head coaches

References

External links
EuroLeague Official Webpage about 2015 Award

Coach of the Year
Basketball coaching awards